Acanthomorpha (meaning "thorn-shaped") is an extraordinarily diverse taxon of teleost fishes with spiny rays. The clade contains about one-third of the world's modern species of vertebrates: over 14,000 species.

A key anatomical innovation in acanthomorphs is hollow and unsegmented spines at the anterior edge of the dorsal and anal fins.  A fish can extend these sharp bony spines to protect itself from predators, but can also retract them to decrease drag when swimming.  Another shared feature is a particular rostral cartilage, associated with ligaments attached to the rostrum and premaxilla, that enables the fish to protrude its jaws considerably to catch food.

Rosen coined the name in 1973 to describe a clade comprising Acanthopterygii, Paracanthopterygii, and also ctenothrissiform fossils from the Cretaceous Period, such as Aulolepis and Ctenothrissa.  Those fossils share several details of the skeleton, and especially of the skull, with modern acanthomorphs.  Originally based on anatomy, Acanthomorpha has been borne out by more recent molecular analyses.

Phylogeny
The phylogeny of living bony fishes

Fossil record and evolutionary history 
Some otoliths, calcium carbonate structures that form the ears of fishes, have been found from the Jurassic Period that may belong to acanthomorphs, but the oldest body fossils from this taxon are only known from the middle of the Cretaceous Period, about 100 million years ago.  Acanthomorphs from the early Late Cretaceous were small, typically about 4 centimeters long, and fairly rare.  Toward the beginning of the Cenozoic era, they exploded in an adaptive radiation, so by the time their fossils begin appear more frequently in Eocene-aged strata, they had reached their modern diversity of 300 families.

Recently discovered fish scales from Poland suggest that the oldest acanthomorphs occurred in the Late Triassic.

Some examples of extinct acanthomorph genera include: 

Asineops
Congorhynchus
Blochius
Enniskillenus
Homorhynchus
Omosomopsis
Palaeorhynchus
Pharmacichthys
Pseudotetrapterus

Timeline of genera

References
Notes

Sources

 
 

 
Taxa named by Donn Eric Rosen
Articles which contain graphical timelines